The Tucana Dwarf Galaxy is a dwarf galaxy in the constellation Tucana.  It was discovered in 1990 by R.J. Lavery of Mount Stromlo Observatory. It is composed of very old stars and is very isolated from other galaxies. Its location on the opposite side of the Milky Way from other Local Group galaxies makes it an important object for study.

Properties

The Tucana Dwarf is a dwarf spheroidal galaxy of type dE5. It contains only old stars, formed in a single star formation era around the time the Milky Way's globular clusters formed. It is not experiencing any current star formation, unlike other isolated dwarf galaxies.

The Tucana Dwarf does not contain very much neutral hydrogen gas. It has a metallicity of -1.8, a significantly low number. There is no significant spread in metallicity throughout the galaxy. There does not seem to be any substructure to the stellar distribution in the galaxy.

Location

The Tucana Dwarf is located in the constellation Tucana.

The Tucana Dwarf galaxy is one of only two dwarf spheroidal galaxies in the Local Group  not located near the Milky Way or the Andromeda Galaxy. It is therefore likely to have evolved in isolation for most of its history.

References

External links
 The Tucana Dwarf Galaxy: HST/WFPC2 Imaging of this Isolated Local Group Dwarf Spheroidal (AAS)

Dwarf galaxies
Dwarf elliptical galaxies
Local Group
Tucana (constellation)
69519
Astronomical objects discovered in 1990